Maharishi Vastu Architecture (MVA) is a set of architectural and planning principles assembled by Maharishi Mahesh Yogi derived from the branch of India's ancient Vedic texts known as Sthāpatya Veda or Vāstu Vidya, the "knowledge of architecture". Maharishi Vastu Architecture is also called "Maharishi Sthapatya Veda", "Fortune-Creating" buildings and homes, and "Maharishi Vedic architecture".

MVA has strict rules governing the orientation and proportions of a building. The most important factor is the entrance, which must be either due east or due north. The MVA architect also considers the slope and shape of the lot, exposure to the rising sun, location of nearby bodies of water and the other buildings or activities in the nearby environment. MVA emphasizes the use of natural or "green" building materials.

MVA homes are marketed in the US by Maharishi Global Construction, LLC (MGC), in Fairfield, Iowa, and by MVA Homes in the UK, both arms of the Transcendental Meditation movement. Several communities around the world have been developed using MVA principles. The plans for Peace Tower, which would have been the world's tallest building, followed MVA specifications.

Origins and principles
Design according to the principles of Vãstu can be seen in India, Cambodia, Indonesia, China, Japan, and Iran. MVA, like other systems of Vãstu, utilizes principles associated with the orientation (azimuth) of buildings and communities, and alignment to the Earth's direction of rotation. A connection is asserted between human health and building materials, orientation to the movement of the sun, and spatial relationships.

According to MVA architect Jon Lipman, Vedic architecture and feng shui have a common root, but MVA is more scientific, feng shui having superstitious elements. Lipman says that MVA is derived from "lost and misunderstood" principles, natural law, "whereby the entire universe is created: galaxies, planets, human beings" along with buildings and cities.

Effects
According to Maharishi Global Construction, building a home according to the principles of MVA "connects the individual intelligence of the occupant of the house to the cosmic intelligence of the universe". Craig Pearson, executive vice president of Maharishi University of Management (MUM), says that spending time in buildings that follow these principles makes one smarter. Proponents say that MVA homes have escaped wildfires that burned neighboring homes, and that businesses located in MVA office buildings have greater profit and lower absenteeism. Residents of MVA homes in Maharishi Vedic City, Iowa say they felt vitality, calm and happiness when they moved into their Vedic houses. A mother says her boys are more orderly. Maharishi Mahesh Yogi has said, "Living in a proper vastu can eliminate 60 to 80 percent of the problems we encounter in life." Peter Warburton, Raja of England, says that the practice of Maharishi's Vedic peace technologies is more powerful with Vastu buildings. Yale University architecture professor Keller Easterling says that MVA is fueled by a desire to create outposts for broadcasting the Maharishi Effect.

Maharishi Sthapatya Veda is considered to be an element of the Maharishi Vedic Approach to Health, and the main modality of MVAH for improving the immediate environment.

Siting
Auspicious locations have water to the east or north. If water is in an inauspicious location then it can be balanced with fountains on the north side. Items in the nearby environment that generate electro-magnetic fields, such as high tension wires and microwave towers, are avoided. The slope, if any, should be towards the east, and there should be no obstructions that block the sun's first rays.

Orientation

The principles of orientation in Maharishi Sthapatya Veda are based on the position of the sun, considered by MVA to be the most powerful natural influence on Earth. Aligning a structure with the rising sun (facing east) is considered by MVA adherents to be auspicious for the building's inhabitants and to be "spiritually healthy." According to the principles of MVA, the other three cardinal directions also have their corresponding influences. For example, homes with entrances facing west invite "poverty, lack of creativity and vitality", and "anxiety, depression, bad luck and even criminal tendencies." According to the MVA official website, the north direction has the influence of prosperity and happiness and the south direction has the influence of negativity, problems and suffering. Proper orientation is also said to increase business productivity.

Placement 

When a house for a particular individual is being designed using MVA principles, the placement of the building and its rooms are carefully planned according to their intended usage and the influence of the sun as it moves throughout the day. Rooms are placed to "take in the sun's light as it passes overhead." Windows and skylights are also used to allow as much natural sunlight as possible to enter the building. An aspect of MVA called "Vastu Vidya" determines the places in the building that are used for generating and storing natural elements like fire and water, heating and plumbing. Bathroom fixtures such as sinks and mirrors also have a particular placement according to MVA rules; Toilets have a particular direction depending on the Vastu design Kitchens and dining rooms should be on the east side, and offices on the west. Commercial buildings are often designed as linear "bar buildings" to offer the most east-facing exposure.

Proportion 

MVA says symmetry is orderly and helps to coordinate the various aspects of a structure, and that there is an ideal proportion for every room in a home or office. Also, the length, width and elevation of the building are calculated using the ancient Vedic mathematical formulas, requiring precision to one-eighth of an inch.

MVA planning takes into account the effects of the Sun, Moon, planets and stars. The poles and the equator are further reference points. Measurements and proportions are said to be calculated in reference to proportions of the human physiology and the cosmos, in harmony with nature.

Features

One of the features of MVA design is the Brahmasthan, whose literal translation is "establish wholeness". The Brahmasthan is a central space "lit by a skylight" that serves as a "silent core" and is "never walked on". The Brahmastan is said to act as the "nucleus" or axis point for the structure like the nucleus of a cell or an atom.

Other features include a perimeter designation called a vastu fence. This boundary line may consist of shrubs or a metal, stone or wood fence. Another feature is a "small, golden, roof ornament" or cupola, called a kalash, which one MVA architect says improves the connection between the residents and heaven. A defined plinth is another standard element. Color is also covered by MVA.

Ceremonies
Three "special ceremonies" performed on "auspicious dates" are recommended by MVA. These include a ground breaking, which is described as digging a precise square hole while facing east, adding organic fertilizer and "sacred water" from India, and making statements of goodwill and success for the new construction. The second ceremony is the laying of the cornerstone and the third is moving-in.

Materials
MVA buildings should not contain any iron or steel. MVA emphasizes the use of natural or "green" building materials such as wood, bricks, adobe, rammed earth, clay, stucco and marble. Other natural fibers such as wood, paper, cotton and wool are used in the interior. The use of natural materials, along with spacious plots and layouts, mean that MVA homes can be expensive, according to the MGC sales director, Eloise Raymond.

Architects

Eike Hartmann is the Minister of Architecture for the Global Country of World Peace, the chair of the department of Maharishi Sthapatya Veda at Vedic University in the Netherlands, and designer of the Maharishi Tower of Invincibility on the campus of Maharishi University of Management USA. Jonathan Lipman is chief architect for Maharishi Global Construction (MGC) and adjunct faculty member at Maharishi University of Management. Lipman reports having designed "hundreds of homes" and office buildings including Tower II, the largest MVA building to date. Henry Clark (deceased) was an architect at MGC and the chief architect and planner for Maharishi Vedic City, Iowa.

Organizations

Maharishi Heaven on Earth Development Corp.

The Maharishi Heaven on Earth Development Corp. (MHOED) announced in 1988 that it planned to build 50 "Maharishi Cities of Immortals" across the U.S. and Canada. The individual homes would be built using MVA specifications with non-toxic materials and natural ventilation. Its long-term goal is to "reconstruct the entire world".

Maharishi Global Development Fund

The Maharishi Global Development Fund (MGDF) was founded in 1997 in New York City. It had an initial capital of $430 million, which grew by hundreds of millions, and the stated capacity to handle multiple projects in several counties worth billions of dollars. It has the goal of constructing buildings that reduce the world's problems. It is also concerned with building cities and countries. It was inaugurated on the top floor of the World Trade Center in 1997, and was a tenant on September 11, 2001.

In 1995, the MGDF purchased a vacant hotel in Hartford, Connecticut, for $1.5 million. After being vacant for more than 15 years, the building sold in 2011 for $500,000. Yale University architecture professor Keller Easterling compares Maharishi Global Development Fund to "Arnold Palmer Golf Management", a developer of golf courses, adding that both "Arnold Palmer Golf Management" and "Transcendental Meditation" are registered trademarks and thus "ideologies and practices" that are regarded as "commercial products". According to Easterling, both companies maintain a partial story which allows them to keep the "brand amnesiacally refreshed" and alter plans without explanation.

Maharishi Global Construction
The Maharishi Global Construction L.L.C. (MGC) markets and guides the construction of MVA buildings. Based in Fairfield, Iowa, Doug Greenfield is its volunteer president, Lipman is its chief architect, Hartmann heads the legal department, and Clark is one of its architects. It offers consulting services to architects and builders, but not architectural services. It advised on $13 million in construction in 1999, and $90 million in 2003. By 2003, it reported having built hundreds of Vastu homes in the US. To reduce the cost of MVA homes, and to simplify compliance with the precise design constraints, MGC has begun to offer modular kits. MGC also offers a "rectification service" to bring existing buildings closer to MVA standards. Maharishi Global Construction L.L.C. officially dissolved in 2006.

Global reconstruction
The Maharishi's Global Reconstruction Program for Permanent World Peace entails replacing the existing cities and buildings of the world with plans and structures that follow MVA principles. The project is estimated by the Global Country of World Peace (GCWP) Finance Minister to cost $300 trillion. A goal of the MGDF is to achieve "heaven on earth". The director of the Global Country of World Peace's Financial Capital, Paul Potter, said "we hope to be able to rebuild the whole world to be fortune-oriented buildings, to be heaven on earth".

MVA principles were mandated in the platform of the Maharishi's "Invincible India Party" (Ajeya Bharat Party). In 1998, it called for an overhaul of building laws to require all new buildings to comply with MVA. One month after its 2001 founding, the Maharishi Vedic City, Iowa, the council passed a resolution saying that city planning should be in accord with MVA principles.

A 2000 document from the Maharishi Global Development Fund outlines a proposed method for cities to transition to Vastu buildings. The first phase is "controlling the expansion of the city by establishing a masterplan with parallel roads in east/west, north/south directions". The second phase is "construction of ideal villages and satellite towns around the city, free from pollution". The third is "starting to demolish congested areas in the city center, replacing them with beautiful gardens, parks and fountains". The fourth is "final stage of the expanded garden city, providing ideal living conditions, including a modern communication and transportation system".

The Maharishi said that "improperly oriented" building should be demolished, including the White House and the U.N. Building. He is quoted as saying that national leaders should vacate inauspicious buildings immediately, "as if an earthquake had hit them". In 2001, he ordered numerous TM centers around the world to close due to inauspicious locations. In 2005, the Maharishi told "everyone in the world to live and work in buildings constructed according to Sthapatya Veda or Vastu architecture". He said then that he would no longer talk or deal with any member of the TM community unless they lived in Vastu structures.

He designated 2006 as the "Year of Reconstruction for the Whole World to be Heaven on Earth". The following year he included reconstruction in his seven-point plan for creating "invincibility for every nation". According to the Maharishi, "All the problems of the world will go away with our Global Reconstruction Programme". The elements of the world reconstruction program, as they appeared in movement newsletter in 2005, includes buildings such as:
"Maharishi Peace Palaces"
"Maharishi Vedic Universities"
"Maharishi Colleges and Schools"
"Maharishi Spas—Health and Rejuvenation Centers"
"Maharishi Fortune-Creating Office Buildings, Malls, and Hotels"

Projects

In the decade prior to 2005, about $250 million was spent on the construction of Maharishi Sthapatya Veda buildings, according to the Rock Island Argus. About a third of that construction took place in the town of Fairfield, Iowa.

According to a 2005 article in the American Airlines magazine, American Way, "hundreds" of homes using MVA principles have been built across the U.S.A. including Wyoming, Iowa, Texas, Kentucky, Florida, North Carolina and Maryland. The article says that "a growing legion of architects and scholars believes that by using the principles of Vedic architecture", good health and fortune can be incorporated into a home or building. That year, an article in Newsweek reported that there had been $500 million in "new Vedic construction" during the prior ten-year period.

A 2008 Washington Post article reports that there are MVA buildings in at least 14 states in the US.

Buildings

Tower II
MVA principles were used for a $72 million, nine-story office complex called "Tower II". Located at 2000 Towers Oaks Boulevard in Rockville, Maryland, the structure has been named the "greenest building in Maryland", achieving a "platinum ranking" in the Leadership in Energy and Environmental Design (LEED), rating system. The "Fortune Creating Architectural/Vedic-designed office building" was developed by Lerner Enterprises and the Tower Companies and designed by Jonathan Lipman. It was the subject of a Harvard Business School case study. The building is one of a handful of MVA structures in the Washington, D.C., area. Jeffrey Abramson, a partner in the family-owned Tower Companies, is a long-time TM practitioner and the chairman of the board of trustees of Maharishi University of Management. According to Abrahamson "The human brain reacts to space" and by using appropriate proportions a working space can be designed to enhance productivity.

MAPI headquarters
A  warehouse and office was built according to MVA principles in Colorado Springs, Colorado, for Maharishi Ayur-Ved Products International Inc. (MAPI). MAPI imports and distributes Maharishi Ayurveda herbal supplements. Every detail of the building, including the placement of the desks, is intentional. There are no fluorescent lights, but windows and skylights are plentiful. When completed in 1997 at a cost of about $3 million, it was considered to be one of only 75 MVA buildings in the US.

MERU

The Maharishi Foundation purchased the  former St. Ludwig College Franciscan monastery at Vlodrop in the Netherlands in 1984. In 1990, it became the Maharishi's headquarters and residence. Demolition of the monastery, which was declared a national monument, encountered resistance from local leaders. The Maharishi Foundation was enjoined from continuing and, after review by the courts was allowed to completely demolish the monastery.  The main building was the Maharishi's residence and office until 2007. It is the largest wooden structure in the country and was built without using any nails, at "vast expense". About the building, the Maharishi is reported to have said that, "the walls of this celebrated building ... in no way enclose his unbounded cosmic awareness". The building is a tourist attraction, though security is tight. A 2007 press release says that 12 Raja palaces have been constructed on the site.

Peace Tower project
The Maharishi hired Minoru Yamasaki, the architect of the World Trade Center towers, to design the world's tallest building. Called "The Centre of India" or the "Vedic Vishwa Prashasan", the 160-story, 2,222' (675.5m) tall building would have been considerably higher than the 1,483' Petronas Towers, then the tallest building in the world. The layered, pyramid-shaped building would be decorated ornately, with arches and columns, like a Hindu or Vedic temple. The base would be 339 meters square, about 11.5 hectares. Priced at $2.5bn, it would have been large enough to hold 60,000 or 100,000 meditators. The foundation stone was laid on November 6, 1998, at the Brahmasthan of India. The elaborate, three-hour ceremony was attended by dignitaries, including representatives from ten countries, and 2,000 local villagers. No specific completion date was given. As of 2010, the Indian tower was still described in news reports as an active project.

In May 1999, the Maharishi Global Development Fund announced that it would build a 1,630' (510m), 103-story tower in downtown Sao Paulo, Brazil. The 60/40 partnership with Brasilinvest, a private development company, had a budget of £1.65 billion or $2bn. The Maharishi Global Development Fund would provide $500 million directly and underwrite the rest of it. Proponents said it would improve a run-down area near city hall, dubbed "cracktown", and restore civic pride. Skeptics questioned the need for the office and commercial space, the carrying capacity of the infrastructure, its location in a flood plain, the Maharishi's finances, and the overall viability of such a large project.

Its floor space, 1.3m sq m, would have been larger than the seven-building World Trade Center complex and almost twice as large as The Pentagon. When it was redesigned as a more conventional glass-sheathed skyscraper, one writer described it as a "giant saltcellar" with a hollow core. The project was slated to have a convention center, four hotels, a university, and apartments. It would have had a monorail stop and underground parking for 25–100,000 cars. Mario Garnero, head of Brasilinvest, said, "This isn't just a building, it's a city." In October 1999, it was announced that the project had the support of the mayor and governor. The land cost, $122 million, would be split between investors and the city. Construction was predicted to begin January 2000. In November 2000, it was announced that the plan was being dropped due to government opposition.

The Peace Tower plan was moved to a  property in The Colony, Texas, a suburb of Dallas, renamed "Global Centre", and rebudgeted at $3bn. The Federal Aviation Administration was concerned about the effect on air traffic and the project did not receive planning approval. The FBI investigated conflict of interest allegations when the former mayor of the city was hired by the Maharishi's company.

Maharishi Development Project's Peter Swan announced plans in August 2000 for a tower at a site next to Alexandra, Johannesburg, South Africa. The 270-hectare property had been sold to the project by the University of the Witwatersrand after it found the soil was unsuitable for housing. Towers were also proposed for each of the 24 time zones.

MIU campus buildings
Maharishi International University (MIU) is building new structures that follow MVA principles to replace 40 demolished buildings on their campus. Most of the buildings on campus are now compliant with some or all MVA principles, including Dreier Building (the first MVA building on campus), Argiro Student Center, and two Peace Palaces.

The Sustainable Learning Center (SLC), designed by Lipman, is being built to the highest LEED standards.

Maharishi Peace Palaces

In 2000, the Maharishi announced plans to build Peace Palaces in the 3,000 largest cities around the world. The buildings would be built with MVA principles and would house "dormitories, classrooms and shops". As of 2007, Peace Palaces have been completed in at least four US locations, and land has been acquired in 52 other locations.

Other buildings
The Spiritual Centre in Nasu, the first MVA building in Japan, was designed like an ancient Japanese palace and is reported to be the country's largest wooden structure. Comprehensive Blood & Cancer Center (CBCC), a  medical center, designed by Lipman, has been constructed in Bakersfield, California. Ravi Patel, the founder of the CBCC, is a trustee of the Maharishi University of Management.

Cities and developments
Maharishi Sthapatya Veda principles apply to communities and cities as well as individual buildings. Communities should have Bramasthans at their centers, just like homes. Ideal cities, according to plans drawn up by the Maharishi, are built in a grid pattern with gardens surrounding them. Cities with bad arrangements include Paris and New York, and it has been proposed that they be rebuilt on MVA standards. Communities built according to MVA principles are called "Peace Colonies". According to the movement's "Maha Media" news portal, a "Maharishi Peace Colony" is a "community founded to help create invincibility for a nation, based on the principles of Maharishi's Vedic Science and its practical applications for living perfection in all areas of life—featuring homes and buildings for group practice of Yogic Flying—all built according to Vedic Architecture, Maharishi Sthapatya Veda."

Maharishi Vedic City

The city plan and buildings of Maharishi Vedic City (MVC) are based on Maharishi Sthapatya Veda. The Maharishi Vedic City is the first settlement to be built entirely on Vedic principles. Easterling says that the city is an intentional community which epitomizes the idea that the personal and communal practice of TM brings a sense of well-being. As the center of the Global Country of World Peace, Easterling says that it reflects the GCWP's interest in achieving a "benign form of global sovereignty".

Other developments in and around Fairfield, Iowa

In addition to Maharishi Vedic City, there are several developments around Fairfield that are being built according to Maharishi Vastu design standards and the latest sustainability technologies.
Abundance Eco-Village is designed as an off-grid, and fully self-supporting development. In March 2008, the development had five family dwellings; in early 2012, there were 14 homes built in three clusters. Eco-Village has plans for a total of 30 homes. In addition to relying on solar and wind for electricity, the development collects its own rainwater and grows organic food in common areas.
Cypress Villages is also designed with both MVA and sustainability principles. As of April 2010, it had 10 residents living in three houses. A petition to incorporate as a city, intended to allow the development to control zoning decisions, was rejected by a state board in May 2010.
MUM North Campus Village is on the northern edge of the Maharishi University of Management campus, and is restricted to people connected to the university or the Super Radiance program.

Heavenly Mountain
Heavenly Mountain is a development near Boone. Several years later, Kaplan "sold most of the land for the Laurelmor development".

A part of the development became the Spiritual Center of America (SCA), a TM-related, non-profit, owned by Upper Blue Mountain Holdings LLC, which is reported to be controlled by Kaplan's extended family, took up  and included a state-accredited university offering degrees in "consciousness-based studies". SCA became the home for the Purusha (men) and Mother Divine (women) groups which practice the TM and TM-Sidhi programs in monastic settings. The groups had separate campuses, built to MVA and Underwriters Laboratories codes. SCA failed to gain an exemption from county taxes after a 2003 state Supreme Court ruling that the facility did not qualify as an "educational, scientific or charitable institution".

One thousand acres (4 km2) were set aside for development as a luxury resort by the for-profit Heavenly Mountain, with over a hundred lots for sale. A 2006 article in the High Country Press reported that a premium on the home prices helped to fund the SCA. The project was controversial in the area until Kaplan reached out to the community. However, Kaplan, a Purusha group member who left the group to marry, broke away from the movement in 2004 and decided to develop the land commercially. The SCA was evicted in 2006. Some home buyers were upset about being evicted and filed lawsuits and as of 2006, 44 condos and homes were still occupied.

Monastic communities
According to a TM organization web site, the Mother Divine group had secured a residence and site for the Maharishi University of Enlightenment at the Heavenly Mountain location. The facilities, called East Campus, were described as rooms and suites for about 200 females, along with dining and lecture halls, totaling almost  of indoor space. The purchase price was estimated by Bevan Morris, Prime Minister of the GWCP, to be one-seventh of the cost for new construction. The remaining 381 acres and 26 buildings of the Heavenly Mountain facility were sold for $6.35 million in 2011 to Blue Ridge Preservation Inc., who intend to work with the Art of Living Foundation and related groups.

The Maharishi Purusha Capital of the Western World is located on  purchased by the Global Country of World Peace in 2009. This followed the Maharishi's call in 2007 to immediately establish a Purusha capital in the Blue Ridge Mountains, according to the Purusha website. It is in the Three Churches area of Hampshire County near Romney, West Virginia. The property will be designated a Global Capital and will include a palace for the Maharaja and residences for the Raja of Invincible America and the Prime Minister. Accommodations for 150–200 people, including 120 professional meditators, are being constructed. The Purusha website mentions the advantages of having as many as 800 "administrators of Global Raam Raj" so close to the nation's capital. The buildings are planned to be built to Vastu and LEED standards. The land cost $750,000 and the construction is budgeted to cost between $10 and $15 million. Bob LoPinto, the Raja of Potomac Vedic America (regional director), is overseeing the project. A nearby but separate medical center or spa is also being considered. An announcement on the Purusha Capital web site dated December 15, 2011, stated that "today we received all of our occupancy permits and so the Maharishi Purusha Capital of the Western World is now officially open!"

Maharishi Garden Village
The Maharishi Garden Village is a 30-home settlement in Rendlesham, Suffolk. The movement had sought to purchase the  former Bentwaters Air Force Base in 1995 for use as a campus but the deal, contingent on planning approval, fell through. On January 12, 2008, the Maharishi's birthday, construction of a 12-story Maharishi Tower of Invincibility was inaugurated on the site. In February 2008, MVA Homes submitted plans to build a £2 million, three-story, 33-bedroom Peace Palace in Rendlesham. It would be part of the 30-home, 24-apartment Maharishi Peace Colony. The plans were approved two months later, despite community concerns. The building will replace a center in Badingham that was used for 25 years. As of 2010, 26 homes had been built and sold, with the remaining 6 to be built in 2011.

Brahmasthan of India
According to the TM movement, the "auspicious" Brahmasthan (center point) of India is near Jabalpur, Madhya Pradesh. The Brahmasthan of India, a geographic point representing the centroid of the Republic of India, was previously identified by the Government of India, locating at 23°30'34.1"N 80°20'37.2"E, approximately 1 km east of the main portion of the large pandit facility constructed under Maharishi's direction. The Government erected a large sculptural benchmark and seating facilities at the location, featuring four lions, the emblems of the Indian state. See the images in Wiki Commons under Brahmasthan. The site has MVA housing for thousands of pandits who perform Vedic chants. The MVA design is said to amplify the power of their peace-promoting rituals. The project is overseen by Girish Varma, one of the Maharishi's nephews. A series of "parliaments", including the "Maharishi Parliament of World Peace in the field of culture and religion", was held there in 2006, according to a movement press release. A documentary filmmaker sneaked into the facility in 2009 and found, in the words of Variety, a "ghost town". In 2010, a press release announced plans for new residential and visitor facilities, including 30 western-style suites.

Brahmasthan of America
The Brahmasthan of America is near Smith Center, Kansas, the geographic center of the contiguous United States. The County Commission initially passed a development moratorium to block the project but changed their decision after being threatened with a federal lawsuit. In regard to the local opposition, Eric Michener, the project coordinator for the GCWP, told a reporter, "I don't think we've run into this vibrant level of misunderstanding before". The group failed to receive an endorsement from the county commission when it sought a $38 million tax-exempt bond from the state. One palace is near completion and several others are in various stages of progress. In April 2010, a local newspaper reported that there was no activity on the site.

Other developments
Mandala Club was promoted in 2005 as a green development in Indian River County, Florida, that would be designed with Vedic principles. Three model homes were approved, out of a total of 90 planned, and the houses were estimated to cost $988,000 each. The  property went into foreclosure and was sold in 2010.

Reception
After hearing a presentation on MVA at the National Building Museum in 2005, a Washington Post reporter said that "non-adherents" may find the principles "eccentric, to say the least", as houses not facing east or north are said by MVA adherents to be "practically begging inauspicious forces to sweep in and wreak havoc." The reporter goes on to say that many architects would not "quibble" with other components of MVA such as "balance and symmetry", a vastu fence or wall and "solar influenced" placement of rooms in the home.

Los Angeles Times travel writer Carina Chocano writes that Maharishi Vedic City "displays all the architectural characteristics of a new exurban development: gaudy, oversize construction that has no stylistic relation to its environment but instead vaguely alludes to a theme-park version, someplace sort of magical and far away."

References

External links
Official site 

Hindu philosophical concepts
Transcendental Meditation
Environmental design
New Age practices
Architectural theory